Jackie and Bruce to the Rescue also known as Fist of Death is 1982 Taiwanese Bruceploitation martial arts movie, starring Kim Tai Chung and Lee Siu Ming.

Plot
The YMCA and Ching Wu school is under attack from the secret gang, which ultimately puts both school into the rivalry. In order to solve the case of the cause of this whole disaster and Ching Wu school's master's death, Bruce (Tong Lung) and Jackie (Lee Siu Ming) must solve for the case once and for all who's all behind this massacre.

Casts
Tong Lung as Brother Bruce 
Lee Siu-Ming as "Jackie"
Eagle Han-ying as Ching Wu student
Wang Pao Yu as Bruce's Love Interest
Ma Sha as Ching Wu student
Hei Ying as final boss

Reception
The movie received general negative critiques towards from the audiences. Imdb gave the score out of 4.5/10. On the other hand, some of the websites such as OoCities, Keith commented "Despite having a messed up storyline, the movie wasn't THAT bad." giving it fairly average rating for the movie. "You’d think a film featuring a Bruce Lee clone AND a Jackie Chan clone (not to mention maverick exploitation producer Dick Randall’s name on the credits) would be a lot of fun, but well, no, it’s not."

Home Media
The film was first introduced to the home DVD media around 2004. The remastered edition was discovered from Baidu.com with full Mandarin dubbed version.

References

External links

http://www.oocities.org/many_bruces/

1982 films
1982 martial arts films
1982 action films
Bruceploitation films
Kung fu films
1980s Mandarin-language films
1980s Hong Kong films